Halfcocked (also known as Half Cocked, Halfc*cked or Half-Cocked) was an American hard rock band. Influenced by 1970s hard rock and punk rock, along with 1980s glam metal, they started out in Boston in 1997 and signed with independent label Curve of the Earth Records. In 1999 the band placed third in the finals of the WBCN Rock & Roll Rumble, being the first "wild card" act to play in the finals. They signed with DreamWorks imprint Megatronic Records (headed by Powerman 5000 frontman Spider One) and moved to Los Angeles in 2000. After numerous delays, they released one final album—The Last Star—before splitting up in 2002.

Personnel
Sarah Reitkopp : Singer
Tommy O'Neil : Guitar
Johnny Rock Heatley : Guitar
Jhen Kobran : Bass, backing vocals
Charlee Johnson : Drums
Jaime Richter : Guitar, backing vocals

Discography

Studio albums
 Sell Out (1998)
 Occupation: Rock Star (2000)
 The Last Star (2001)

Compilation appearances
Girls! Girls! Girls! (1998, Curve of the Earth) (song: "Whole in the World")
Benefit for El Chupacabra (1998, Polterchrist) (song: "Ghost Bones")
Dracula 2000 soundtrack (2000, Sony) (song: "Sober")
Shrek soundtrack (2001, DreamWorks) (song: "Bad Reputation", the original Joan Jett version is heard in the film)
WWF Tough Enough (2001, DreamWorks) (song: "Drive Away")

References

External links

Megatronic Records
Artist page, Curve of the Earth Records
20 Questions with Charlee Johnson, Metal Sludge, October 23, 2001.

Hard rock musical groups from Massachusetts
Musical groups from Boston
Musical groups established in 1997
Musical groups disestablished in 2002